Miami Southridge Senior High School is a secondary school located in South Miami Heights, Florida (Miami postal address).  Its current principal is Humberto J. Miret.  The school serves ninth through twelfth grade students in a mostly unincorporated suburban and rural area in the southern stretches of Miami-Dade County between South Miami and Homestead.

History

Miami Southridge was the zoned high school for Cutler Bay prior to 2012.  Now Cutler Bay High School is the zoned school.

Campus
It is in South Miami Heights, a census-designated place in unincorporated Miami-Dade County, Florida, with a Miami postal address.

Demographics
In 2009-10, Miami Southridge Senior High School's student body was 48.2% Hispanic (of any race), 40.3% Black, and 8.7% non-Hispanic White. Smaller groups included Asian, Indian, and multiracial ethnicities.

54.9% of the students were eligible for free and reduced lunch, 19.2% were students with disabilities
(SWD), and 9.3% were students of limited English proficiency (LEP).

Academic performance 

In 2011 Perry Stein of the Miami Herald described Southridge as "a low-performing school".

Notable alumni

Athletics

Baseball
Robert Andino - Major League Baseball player (Baltimore Orioles)
 Yan Gomes - Major League Baseball player 
 Fredi Gonzalez - Major League manager (Atlanta Braves)
 Orlando Palmeiro - Major League Baseball player
 Nelson Santovenia - former Major League Baseball player (Montreal Expos)
 Shannon Stewart - Major League Baseball player (Toronto Blue Jays)

Football
 Robert Bailey - former cornerback in the National Football League
 Dicaprio Bootle - player for the Kansas City Chiefs
 Courtland Bullard - former linebacker in the National Football League
 Jamal Carter - American football player
 Jameel Cook - former fullback in the National Football League 
 Shawn Davis - American Football player
 Darren Davis - former running back in the Canadian Football League
 Troy Davis - former running back in the National Football League and Canadian Football League
 Steve Everitt - former offensive lineman in the National Football League
 Steve Grant - former linebacker in the National Football League
 Lamont Green - former linebacker in the National Football League
 Sedrick Irvin - former running back in the National Football League
 Tim Lester - former running back in the National Football League
 Justin McCray- NFL (Offensive Linemen) Tennessee Titans, Green Bay Packers, Cleveland Browns, Atlanta Falcons
 Jeremiah McKinnon - American football player
 Winston Moss - former NFL player and coach
 Damaso Munoz -former NFL and CFL player 
 Branden Oliver, running back in the National Football League
 Willis Peguese, former defensive end in the National Football League
 Kevin Smith - former running back in the National Football League
 Shevin Smith - former safety in the National Football League
 Lenny Taylor, former wide receiver in the National Football League and the Arena Football League
 Mark Word, former defensive end in the National Football League

Mixed martial arts
 Mike Rio - former fighter in the UFC, also participated in the reality show The Ultimate Fighter

Notable faculty
Steve Hertz, baseball player and coach

See also 
 Miami-Dade County Public Schools

References

External links
 Miami Southridge Senior High School
 
 Southridge alumni

Educational institutions established in 1974
Miami Southridge
1974 establishments in Florida